Morten Kihle (born 28 August 1967) is a retired Norwegian football midfielder.

He played youth football for Tønsberg Turn, also representing Norway's youth international teams. Ahead of the 1986 season he went on to Eik-Tønsberg. He also spent time in Ørn, from 1987. He got the chance on the first tier in 1994, with Vålerenga. Featuring in a little more half the league games, he went back to Eik-Tønsberg in 1996, only to be picked up by Strømsgodset in the summer of 1997.

Passing the 30-year mark, he stepped down two tiers to Sandefjord in 1999, securing promotion to the 2000 1. divisjon. He retired after the 2000 season, going on with sixth-tier minnows Barkåker IF.

References

1969 births
Living people
Sportspeople from Tønsberg
Norwegian footballers
Eik-Tønsberg players
FK Ørn-Horten players
Vålerenga Fotball players
Strømsgodset Toppfotball players
Sandefjord Fotball players
Norwegian First Division players
Eliteserien players
Association football midfielders
Norway youth international footballers